The 1824 United States presidential election in Maryland took place between October 26 and December 2, 1824, as part of the 1824 United States presidential election. Voters chose 11 representatives, or electors to the Electoral College, who voted for President and Vice President.

During this election, the Democratic-Republican Party was the only major national party, and four different candidates from this party sought the Presidency. Although Maryland voted for John Quincy Adams over Andrew Jackson, William H. Crawford and Henry Clay, only three electoral votes were assigned to Adams, while Jackson received seven and Crawford received one. Adams won Maryland by a very narrow margin of 0.32%.

Starting with the 1796 United States presidential election and ending with this election, Maryland used an electoral district system to choose its electors, with each district electing a single elector. This is similar to the way Nebraska and Maine choose their electors in modern elections.

Results

Results by electoral district

Results by county

See also
 United States presidential elections in Maryland
 1824 United States presidential election
 1824 United States elections

Notes

References 

Maryland
1824
Presidential